Hitler Umanath is a 1982 Indian Tamil-language film, directed by P. Madhavan. The film stars Sivaji Ganesan, K. R. Vijaya, Sathyaraj and Suruli Rajan.

Plot 
A mild-mannered, innocent, gullible and timid man causes amusement when he comes to work in a business — because of his moustache's resemblance to Adolf Hitler. Soon, however, he finds himself growing into a more forceful and dynamic person, becoming a charismatic leader and a successful businessman as his wife teaches him more and more about Hitler's charismatic personality, dynamism, organizational and leadership abilities. He uses Hitler as a template reaching a point where he works without even requiring much sleep even forgoing his wife's daily lessons causing him to alienate himself from his wife and daughter. He builds a business empire that runs like clockwork only to find out that his daughter has married a young man who considers Umanath as his enemy to get back at him.

In the end, once he finds out about Hitler's evil deeds, he regrets emulating such an evil person.

Cast 

Sivaji Ganesan as Umanath
K. R. Vijaya as Lakshmi
Sathyaraj
Suruli Rajan
Sadhana as Umanath's daughter
Baby Anju
N. S. Ramji
Satheesh
Samikannu
S. Ramarao
Veeraraghavan
Peeli Sivam
Major Sundarrajan in Guest Appearance
V. S. Raghavan in Guest Appearance
Kathadi Ramamurthy in Guest Appearance
Saroja
Jeyachandra

Soundtrack 
Soundtrack was composed by M. S. Viswanathan and lyrics for all songs written by Kannadasan.
Silai Vannam – Vani Jairam
Nambikkaiye – P. Susheela
Sir Ungalathan – T. M. Soundarrajan

References

External links 
 

1980s Tamil-language films
1982 films
Cultural depictions of Adolf Hitler
Films scored by M. S. Viswanathan
Films directed by P. Madhavan